Robert M. Shelby was an American poet (November 3, 1935 Joplin, Missouri - March 15, 2016, Benicia, California). He served as the poet laureate of Benicia, California from 2008 to 2010.

Born in Joplin, Missouri, Shelby grew up in Los Angeles, California. After serving in the United States Naval Reserve, he attended the University of California, Berkeley, and moved to Benicia in 2002. He published many poetry books including Leaves Away, Quick Americana, The Thousand Story Pagoda, Woman in a White Cap, Flying Apples, Falling Parasols, Music From The Bones, Quick Orientalia, and Raining Down Dogs, Bouncing Up Cats, And A Few Birds

See also 

 Joel Fallon
 List of municipal poets laureate in California

References

Municipal Poets Laureate in the United States
Poets from California
People from Benicia, California
21st-century American male writers
American male poets
1935 births
21st-century American poets
2016 deaths